1-Butanol, also known as butan-1-ol or n-butanol, is a primary alcohol with the chemical formula C4H9OH and a linear structure. Isomers of 1-butanol are isobutanol, butan-2-ol and tert-butanol. The unmodified term butanol usually refers to the straight chain isomer.

1-Butanol occurs naturally as a minor product of the ethanol fermentation of sugars and other saccharides and is present in many foods and drinks. It is also a permitted artificial flavorant in the United States, used in butter, cream, fruit, rum, whiskey, ice cream and ices, candy, baked goods, and cordials. It is also used in a wide range of consumer products.

The largest use of 1-butanol is as an industrial intermediate, particularly for the manufacture of butyl acetate (itself an artificial flavorant and industrial solvent). It is a petrochemical derived from propylene. Estimated production figures for 1997 are: United States 784,000 tonnes; Western Europe 575,000 tonnes; Japan 225,000 tonnes.

Production
Since the 1950s, most 1-butanol is produced by the hydroformylation of propene (oxo process) to preferentially form the butyraldehyde n-butanal.  Typical catalysts are based on cobalt and rhodium. Butyraldehyde is then hydrogenated to produce butanol.

A second method for producing butanol involves the Reppe reaction of propylene with CO and water:
CH3CH=CH2 + H2O + 2 CO → CH3CH2CH2CH2OH + CO2

In former times, butanol was prepared from crotonaldehyde, which can be obtained from acetaldehyde.

Butanol can also be produced by fermentation of biomass by bacteria. Prior to the 1950s, Clostridium acetobutylicum was used in industrial fermentation to produce butanol. Research in the past few decades showed results of other microorganisms that can produce butanol through fermentation.

Industrial use
Constituting 85% of its use, 1-butanol is mainly used in the production of varnishes. It is a popular solvent, e.g. for nitrocellulose. A variety of butyl esters are used as solvents, e.g. butoxyethanol. Many plasticizers are based on butyl esters, e.g., dibutyl phthalate. The monomer butyl acrylate is used to produce polymers. It is the precursor to n-butylamines.

Biofuel
1-Butanol has been proposed as a substitute for diesel fuel and gasoline. It is produced in small quantities in nearly all fermentations (see fusel oil). Clostridium produces much higher yields of butanol.  Research is underway to increase the biobutanol yield from biomass.

Butanol is considered as a potential biofuel (butanol fuel). Butanol at 85 percent strength can be used in cars designed for gasoline without any change to the engine (unlike 85% ethanol), and it provides more energy for a given volume than ethanol, almost as much as gasoline. Therefore, a vehicle using butanol would return fuel consumption more comparable to gasoline than ethanol. Butanol can also be added to diesel fuel to reduce soot emissions.

The production of, or in some cases, the use of, the following substances may result in exposure to 1-butanol: artificial leather, butyl esters, rubber cement, dyes, fruit essences, lacquers, motion picture, and photographic films, raincoats, perfumes, pyroxylin plastics, rayon, safety glass, shellac varnish, and waterproofed cloth.

Occurrence in nature
Butan-1-ol occurs naturally as a result of carbohydrate fermentation in a number of alcoholic beverages, including beer, grape brandies, wine, and whisky. It has been detected in the volatiles of hops, jack fruit, heat-treated milks, musk melon, cheese, southern pea seed, and cooked rice. 1-Butanol is also formed during deep frying of corn oil, cottonseed oil, trilinolein, and triolein.

Butan-1-ol is one of the "fusel alcohols" (from the German for "bad liquor"), which include alcohols that have more than two carbon atoms and have significant solubility in water.  It is a natural component of many alcoholic beverages, albeit in low and variable concentrations. It (along with similar fusel alcohols) is reputed to be responsible for severe hangovers, although experiments in animal models show no evidence for this.

1-Butanol is used as an ingredient in processed and artificial flavorings, and for the extraction of lipid-free protein from egg yolk, natural flavouring materials and vegetable oils, the manufacture of hop extract for beermaking, and as a solvent in removing pigments from moist curd leaf protein concentrate.

Metabolism and toxicity
The acute toxicity of 1-butanol is relatively low, with oral LD50 values of 790–4,360 mg/kg (rat; comparable values for ethanol are 7,000–15,000 mg/kg). It is metabolized completely in vertebrates in a manner similar to ethanol: alcohol dehydrogenase converts 1-butanol to butyraldehyde; this is then converted to butyric acid by aldehyde dehydrogenase. Butyric acid can be fully metabolized to carbon dioxide and water by the β-oxidation pathway. In the rat, only 0.03% of an oral dose of 2,000 mg/kg was excreted in the urine. At sub-lethal doses, 1-butanol acts as a depressant of the central nervous system, similar to ethanol: one study in rats indicated that the intoxicating potency of 1-butanol is about 6 times higher than that of ethanol, possibly because of its slower transformation by alcohol dehydrogenase.

Other hazards
Liquid 1-butanol, as is common with most organic solvents, is extremely irritating to the eyes; repeated contact with the skin can also cause irritation. This is believed to be a generic effect of defatting. No skin sensitization has been observed. Irritation of the respiratory pathways occurs only at very high concentrations (>2,400 ppm).

With a flash point of 35 °C, 1-butanol presents a moderate fire hazard: it is slightly more flammable than kerosene or diesel fuel but less flammable than many other common organic solvents. The depressant effect on the central nervous system (similar to ethanol intoxication) is a potential hazard when working with 1-butanol in enclosed spaces, although the odour threshold (0.2–30 ppm) is far below the concentration which would have any neurological effect.

See also
 Butanol fuel

External links

References

Alcohol solvents
Primary alcohols
GABAA receptor positive allosteric modulators
Sedatives
Hypnotics
Alkanols
Butyl compounds